Events of 2019 in Ethiopia.

Events 

 10 March 2019 – Ethiopian Airlines Flight 302 from Addis Ababa Bole International Airport in Ethiopia to Jomo Kenyatta International Airport in Nairobi, Kenya crashed six minutes after takeoff near the town of Bishoftu, killing all 149 passengers and eight crew aboard.
29 July 2019 – Prime Minister Abiy Ahmed leads a reforestation effort that planted 350 million trees in one day, believed to be a world record.

Births

Deaths

March
 March 10
 Victims of Ethiopian Airlines Flight 302 plane crash:
 Pius Adesanmi, Nigerian-Canadian professor and writer (b. 1972)
 Christine Alalo, Ugandan police officer and peacekeeper (b. 1970)
 Sebastiano Tusa, Italian archaeologist and politician (b. 1952)

June
 June 22
 Ambachew Mekonnen, Ethiopian politician (b. 1971)
 Se'are Mekonnen, Ethiopian army officer (b. 1954)

References

 
Ethiopia